Inferior gluteal can refer to:
 Inferior gluteal artery
 Inferior gluteal line
 Inferior gluteal nerve
 Inferior gluteal veins